This article concerns the period 169 BC – 160 BC.

References